Trivia is information and data that are considered to be of little value.

Trivia or Trivial may also refer to:
 Trivia (album), a 1986 album by Utopia
 Trivial (film), a 2007 film
 Trivia (gastropod), a genus of small sea snails in the family Triviidae
 Triviality (mathematics), technical simplicity of some aspects of proofs
 Trivia, an epithet of the Roman goddesses Hecate and Diana/Artemis, each in their roles as protector of the crossroads (trivia, “three ways”).
 Trivia (poem), a poem by John Gay
 "Trivia" (The Office), an episode of The Office

See also 
 Quantum triviality, a trait of classical theories that become trivial when viewed in quantum terms
 Parkinson's law of triviality
 Trivial name, a type of name in chemical nomenclature
 Trivial Pursuit (disambiguation)
 Trivialism
 Trivium (disambiguation)

he:בוגר אוניברסיטה#מקור השם